Da Game of Life is the fifth album by rap duo, Totally Insane. It was released on April 13, 2001 for The Insane Empire and was produced by Mac-10 and Ad Kapone.

Track listing
"Empire"- 3:00  
"Niggaracci"- 4:31  
"Maintain"- 3:52  
"We Got It Locked"- 3:29  
"Do Your Thing"- 3:20  
"All In"- 2:42  
"Mr. President"- 2:50  
"Let Em Die"- 4:52  
"The Real Me"- 3:46  
"Rougish  Love"- 4:25  
"Fuckin Tonight"- 3:30  
"Politics"- 3:52  
"Hopin to Be the Man"-  4:35  
"Da Game of Life"- 4:06

2001 albums
Totally Insane albums